How Do You Burn? is the ninth studio album by American rock band the Afghan Whigs. The album was released on September 9, 2022, through BMG Rights Management, making it their first album since 1998's 1965 to not be released under Sub Pop.

Three singles were released by the band ahead of the album's release: "I'll Make You See God", "The Getaway", and "A Line of Shots".

Critical reception  

How Do You Burn? received critical acclaim from contemporary music critics upon its release. On review aggregator website, Metacritic, How Do You Burn? has an average rating of 82 out of 100 indicating "universal acclaim based on eight critic reviews". On AnyDecentMusic?, the album has an average rating of 7.7 out of 10 based on eight reviews.

Track listing

Charts

References

External links 
 

The Afghan Whigs albums
2022 albums
BMG Rights Management albums
Albums produced by Greg Dulli